Ron Giles may refer to:

Ron Giles (cricketer) (1919–2010), English cricketer who played for Nottinghamshire
Ron Giles (television executive) (born 1942), American television executive
Ronald Giles, Chief Judge of Michigan's 36th District Court
Carl Giles (Ronald Giles, 1916–1995), English cartoonist for the Daily Express

See also
Giles (surname)
Ronald